Walchandnagar Industries Limited (WIL) (NSE: WALCHANNAG, BSE: 507410) is a heavy engineering products and EP&C services company, based in Mumbai, India.

History
Walchandnagar Industries was founded by Walchand Hirachand Doshi in 1908.

WIL was subject to sanctions by the United States following Pokhran-II for its involvement in India's nuclear and space programs. The sanctions were dropped in 2001.

References

Manufacturing companies based in Mumbai
Engineering companies of India
Walchand Group
Indian companies established in 1908
Manufacturing companies established in 1908
Companies listed on the National Stock Exchange of India
Companies listed on the Bombay Stock Exchange